During the civilian administration that existed prior to the seizure of power by the Supreme Revolutionary Council (SRC) in 1969, there were a number of local political parties. Most notable of these early institutions was the Somali Youth League, the nation's first political organization. Upon assuming office, the Siad Barre-led SRC outlawed all extant political parties and advocated a form of scientific socialism inspired by Maoist China and the Soviet Union. 

Following the outbreak of the civil war in 1991 that saw the ouster of the Barre regime, many of the few remaining political parties gave way to autonomous or semi-autonomous regional states in the northern part of the country, or fragmented into feuding militia groups in the south. 

After several unsuccessful national reconciliation efforts, a Transitional Federal Government (TFG) was formed in 2004 with a mandate leading toward the establishment of a new constitution and a transition to a representative government.

Post-transition

In June 2011, the mandates of President Sharif Sheikh Ahmed, the Parliament Speaker Sharif Adan Sharif Hassan and Deputies were extended until August 2012, after which point new elections were to be organized.

As part of the official "Roadmap for the End of Transition", Somali government officials met in the northeastern town of Garowe in February 2012 to discuss post-transition arrangements. After extensive deliberations attended by regional actors and international observers, the conference ended in a signed agreement between President Sharif Sheikh Ahmed, Prime Minister Abdiweli Mohamed Ali, Speaker of Parliament Sharif Adan Sharif Hassan, Puntland President Abdirahman Mohamed Farole, Galmudug President Mohamed Ahmed Alim and Ahlu Sunnah Waljama'a representative Khalif Abdulkadir Noor stipulating that: 
a) a new 225 member bicameral parliament would be formed, consisting of an upper house seating 54 Senators as well as a lower house; 
b) 30% of the National Constituent Assembly (NCA) is earmarked for women; 
c) the President is to be appointed via a constitutional election; and 
d) the Prime Minister is selected by the President and he/she then names his/her Cabinet.

2016-2017 Elections 

The 2016-2017 election was by indirect suffrage. The last one-person-one-vote election in Somalia was in 1969 and the resulting government did not last the year. Under Halima Ismail Ibrahim and the National Independent Electoral Commission another one person one vote election was supposed to take place at a cost of $53 million in 2020/2021.

2021-2022 Elections

Popular elections were to be held in Somalia in 2020 for the first time since 1969, but a constituency election model will be implemented instead. UNSOM has been mandated to support the preparation for the elections. The 2021 Elections in Somalia were both scheduled to take place in February but were delayed.

Elections for the Senate, the upper house of Somalia's bi-cameral legislature, were held between 29 July and 13 November 2021. The resulting membership of the Senate fell short of the 30% threshold for women, with only 24% (13 out of 54) of seats in the Senate held by women.

Elections for the House of the People, the lower house of Somalia's legislature, began on 1 November and expected to conclude on 24 December 2021. The elections were initially extended to 25 February, then to 15 March, and were scheduled to be completed by 31 March 2022. As of 31 March, 26 out of 275 seats remained unfilled.

The presidential election will be held after the completion of parliamentary elections.

See also
 Electoral calendar
 Electoral system

References

External links
African Elections Database